American actor and filmmaker Bradley Cooper has received several awards and nominations for his film and theatrical performances. His major nominations include nine Academy Awards, eight British Academy Film Awards, six Golden Globe Awards, eight MTV Movie & TV Awards, three Producers Guild Award, two Directors Guild Awards, one Writers Guild Award, seven Satellite Awards, five Screen Actors Guild Awards, three Billboard Music Awards, three Grammy Awards, and one Tony Award. Thanks to his contributions on the A Star Is Born soundtrack, he won a Grammy Award for Best Pop Duo/Group Performance for "Shallow" and a BAFTA Award for Best Film Music, both shared with Lady Gaga.

While Cooper's film career began in 2001 with the cult film Wet Hot American Summer, his breakthrough performance came in the 2009 comedy The Hangover. Cooper was nominated for an MTV Movie Award and a Satellite Award for Best Actor – Motion Picture. However, Cooper also won a Golden Raspberry Award that same year for his performance in All About Steve. The next two years saw Cooper receive nominations for his performances in various action and comedy films like The A-Team (2010), Limitless, and The Hangover Part II (both in 2011).

Cooper began 2012 with a Teen Choice Award nomination for The Words, before playing the role of Pat Solitano in the critically acclaimed romantic comedy-drama Silver Linings Playbook. The film garnered numerous accolades, with Cooper winning an MTV Movie Award, while receiving nominations for an Academy Award, Golden Globe Award, and Screen Actors Guild Award for Best Actor. The following year, Cooper played the supporting role of Richie DiMaso, in the crime-comedy American Hustle. The film was a critical success, and garnered several accolades. Cooper was nominated for an Academy Award, BAFTA Award, Critics' Choice Movie Award, and Golden Globe Award for Best Supporting Actor, but did not win any.

In 2014, Cooper received two nominations for his role as Rocket in the superhero film Guardians of the Galaxy. Later that year, he starred in and co-produced the biographical war film American Sniper. Cooper was nominated for an Academy Award and MTV Movie Award for Best Actor, and an Academy Award for Best Picture. With these nominations, Cooper became only the tenth actor in history to receive an Academy Award nomination in three consecutive years. Although Cooper's roles in the 2015 films Aloha and Joy earned him two additional nominations, his performance as the severely deformed Joseph Merrick in the Broadway revival The Elephant Man garnered more recognition. His performance in The Elephant Man landed him four nominations, including a nod for a Tony Award for Best Actor in a Play.

Major industry awards

Academy Awards
The Academy Awards are a set of awards given annually for excellence of cinematic achievements. The awards, organized by the Academy of Motion Picture Arts and Sciences, were first held in 1929 at the Hollywood Roosevelt Hotel. Cooper has received nine nominations.

BAFTA Film Awards
The BAFTA Award is an annual award show presented by the British Academy of Film and Television Arts. The awards were founded in 1947 as The British Film Academy, by David Lean, Alexander Korda, Carol Reed, Charles Laughton, Roger Manvell and others. Cooper has won one award from eight nominations.

Golden Globe Awards
The Golden Globe Award is an accolade bestowed by the 93 members of the Hollywood Foreign Press Association (HFPA) recognizing excellence in film and television, both domestic and foreign. Cooper has received six nominations.

Grammy Awards
The Grammy Awards are an award presented by The Recording Academy to recognize achievements in the music industry. Cooper has won two awards out of three nominations.

Tony Awards
The Tony Awards are a set of awards recognizing achievements in live Broadway theatre. The awards, presented by the American Theatre Wing and The Broadway League, were first held in 1947 at the Waldorf Astoria New York. Cooper has been nominated once.

Guild awards

Directors Guild Awards
The Directors Guild of America Awards are issued annually by the Directors Guild of America. The first DGA Award was an "Honorary Life Member" award issued in 1938 to D. W. Griffith. The statues are made by New York firm, Society Awards. Cooper has been nominated twice.

Producers Guild Awards
The Producers Guild Awards are presented annually by the Producers Guild of America to honor film producers. Cooper has been nominated three times.

Screen Actors Guild Awards
The Screen Actors Guild Awards are organized by the Screen Actors Guild‐American Federation of Television and Radio Artists. First awarded in 1995, the awards aim to recognize excellent achievements in film and television. Cooper has received one award from five nominations.

Writers Guild of America Awards
The Writers Guild of America Award is given annually by the Writers Guild of America, East and Writers Guild of America, West for outstanding achievements in film, television and media writing. Cooper has been nominated once.

Film festivals' awards

Capri, Hollywood International Film Festival 
The Capri Hollywood International Film Festival is an annual international film festival held in every late December/early January in Capri, Italy. Established in 1995, the competition section is open to international films, animation, documentaries and fiction. Cooper has been awarded twice.

Palm Springs International Film Festival
Founded in 1989 in Palm Springs, California, the Palm Springs International Film Festival is held annually in January. Cooper has been awarded three times.

Venice Film Festival
The Venice Film Festival or Venice International Film Festival is the oldest film festival in the world. It was founded in 1932 and held annually in Venice. Cooper has been awarded once.

Other awards and nominations

American Film Institute Awards
The American Film Institute Awards is presented annually by American Film Institute to honors 10 outstanding films and 10 outstanding television programs of the year. Cooper has been awarded three times.

American Music Awards
The American Music Awards is an annual awards ceremony created by Dick Clark in 1973. Cooper has received two nominations.

Australian Academy of Cinema and Television Arts Awards
The AACTA Awards are presented annually by the Australian Academy of Cinema and Television Arts to recognize and honor achievements in the film and television industry. Cooper has received six nominations.

AARP's Movies for Grownups Awards 
The AARP's Movies for Grownups Awards "recognizes achievements of those in the entertainment industry age 50 and over, and the films that speak to that vast audience," as well as supports the overall goals of the AARP. Cooper has received three nominations.

American Cinematheque Awards
The American Cinematheque Award annually honors "an extraordinary artist in the entertainment industry who is fully engaged in his or her work and is committed to making a significant contribution to the art of the motion pictures". Cooper has been awarded once.

Billboard Music Awards 
The Billboard Music Awards honor artists for commercial performance in the U.S., based on record charts published by Billboard. The award ceremony was held from 1990 to 2007, until its reintroduction in 2011. Cooper has received three nominations.

Bodil Awards 
The Bodil Awards are the major Danish film awards given by Danish Film Critics Association. Established in 1948, it is one of the oldest film awards in Europe. Cooper has received one nomination.

Danish Music Awards
The Danish Music Awards, previously known as Dansk Grammy, is a music award ceremony presented by IFPI Danmark since 1989. Cooper has received one award.

Dorian Awards
The Dorian Awards are presented by the Gay and Lesbian Entertainment Critics Association (GALECA). Cooper has received one award.

Drama Desk Awards
Presented by The Drama Desk Organization, the Drama Desk Awards are held annually to award the best in Broadway, Off-Broadway, and Off-Off-Broadway theatre. Cooper has been nominated once.

Drama League Awards
Presented by the Drama League of New York, the Drama League Awards is the oldest annual event in the United States held to award theatrical productions and performers in several categories. Cooper has been nominated once.

Elle Style Awards 
The Elle Style Awards are an awards ceremony hosted annually by Elle magazine. Cooper has been awarded once.

Empire Awards
The Empire Awards is a British awards ceremony held annually to recognize cinematic achievements. Cooper has received one nomination.

Golden Eagle Awards 
The Golden Eagle Awards is an accolade by the National Academy of Motion Pictures Arts and Sciences of Russia to recognize excellence of professionals in the film industry, directors, actors, and writers. Cooper has been nominated once.

Golden Raspberry Awards
Founded in 1981 by John J. B. Wilson, the Golden Raspberry Awards is an annual award show that selects the worst in film for each year. Cooper has been awarded once.

Golden Schmoes Awards

Gotham Awards
Presented by the Independent Filmmaker Project, the Gotham Awards award the best in independent film. Cooper has been nominated once.

GQ Men of the Year Awards 
GQ (U.S.) first named their Men of the Year in 1996, featuring the award recipients in a special issue of the magazine. Cooper has been awarded once.

Grande Prêmio do Cinema Brasileiro 
The Grande Prêmio do Cinema Brasileiro is a Brazilian film award established in 2000 and given by the Academia Brasileira de Cinema since 2002. Cooper has received one award.

Hollywood Film Awards
The Hollywood Film Awards are held annually to recognize talent in the film industry. Cooper has received two awards.

Hollywood Music in Media Awards
The Hollywood Music in Media Awards (HMMA) recognizes and honors the music of visual mediums (films, TV, movie trailers, video games, commercials, etc.). Cooper has received two nominations.

{| class="wikitable" style="width:100%;"
|-
! width=5%|Year
! style="width:40%;"| Nominated work
! style="width:40%;"| Category
! style="width:10%;"| Result
! width=5%|
|-
| rowspan="2"|2018
| A Star Is Born
| Best Soundtrack Album
| 
|style="text-align:center;" rowspan="2"|
|-
| "Shallow"
| Best Original Song – Feature Film
|

Hungarian Music Awards
The Hungarian Music Awards, commonly known as the Fonogram, are presented annually by the Mahasz since 1992. Cooper has received one award.

Independent Spirit Awards
The Independent Spirit Awards are presented annually by Film Independent, to award the best in the independent film community. Cooper has received one nomination.

Irish Film and Television Academy
The Irish Film & Television Academy Awards are presented annually to award the best in films and television. Cooper has been nominated once.

Jupiter Awards
The Jupiter Award is a German annual cinema award. It is Germany's biggest audience award for cinema and TV and is awarded annually by Cinema magazine and TV Spielfilm in eleven categories since 1979. Cooper has been nominated twice.

MTV Millennial Awards
The MTV Millennial Awards, held annually in Latin America, were established in 2013 by MTV Latino to award music artists. Cooper has been nominated once.

MTV Millennial Awards Brazil
The MTV Millennial Awards Brazil were established in 2018 by MTV Brasil to celebrate music, television and internet artists. Cooper has won one award out of two nominations.

MTV Movie & TV Awards
The MTV Movie & TV Awards (formerly known as the MTV Movie Awards) is an annual award show presented by MTV to honor outstanding achievements in films and television. Founded in 1992, the winners of the awards are decided online by the audience. Cooper has received five awards from eight nominations.

MTV Video Music Awards
The MTV Video Music Awards, commonly abbreviated as VMA, were established in 1984 by MTV to celebrate the top music videos of the year. Cooper has received two nominations.

NRJ Music Awards
The NRJ Music Awards were created in 2000 by the radio station NRJ in partnership with the television network TF1. Cooper has received one award.

Outer Critics Circle Awards
The Outer Critics Circle Awards is an annual event honoring the best in both Broadway and Off-Broadway. Cooper has been nominated once.

People's Choice Awards
The People's Choice Awards is an American awards show recognizing the people and the work of popular culture. The show has been held annually since 1975 and is voted on by the general public. Cooper has received four nominations.

Robert Awards 
The Robert Award is a Danish film prize awarded each year by the Danish Film Academy. The Robert was awarded for the first time in 1984 and is named after the statuette's creator, the Danish sculptor Robert Jacobsen. Cooper has received one nomination.

Russian National Movie Awards
The Russian National Movie Award "Georges" is an annual award presented to recognize excellence of professionals in the film industry, directors, actors, and writers. The award was established by LiveJournal bloggers Alexander Folin, Maxim Alexandrov and Olga Belik in 2005. Cooper has received one nomination.

Satellite Awards
The Satellite Awards are a set of annual awards given by the International Press Academy. Cooper has received two awards from eight nominations.

ShoWest Convention, USA
The National Association of Theatre Owners (NATO) is a United States-based trade organization whose members are the owners of movie theaters. In now-renamed CinemaCon in 2011, the convention is NATO's only official convention of theater owners controlled by the organization itself. CinemaCon is now a standalone movie theater industry trade show or exposition originally established by NATO in 1975, usually held in Las Vegas in March. Cooper has received one nomination.

Swiss Music Awards
The Swiss Music Awards (SMA) is Switzerland's largest award ceremony for music, and serves to promote the national music scene and showcase its cultural diversity. Cooper has won one award.

TEC Awards
The TEC Awards are an annual program recognizing the achievements of audio professionals. The winners are announced and the awards presented at a ceremony held at the NAMM Show. Cooper has received one award in the Outstanding Creative Achievement area.

Teen Choice Awards
The Teen Choice Awards is an annual awards show that airs on the Fox Network. The awards honor the year's biggest achievements in music, movies, sports, television, fashion and other categories, voted by teen viewers. Cooper has received eleven nominations.

Critics associations

References

Notes

Footnotes

External links

Bradley Cooper on Box Office Mojo

Cooper, Bradley
Awards